Thor-Øistein Endsjø (born 1 May 1936) is a Norwegian physician and former sports shooter.

He competed in the 25 metre pistol event at the 1972 Summer Olympics. As a physician he worked at private clinics in Oslo and Bærum, include Humana which he co-established in Sandvika. He has been the team physician for Norway in five Olympic Games and been associated with the Norwegian Athletics Association and several other sports federations. He resides at Blommenholm.

References

1936 births
Living people
Norwegian male sport shooters
Olympic shooters of Norway
Shooters at the 1972 Summer Olympics
People from Bærum
Norwegian sports physicians
20th-century Norwegian people